is a Japanese animation studio subsidiary of Digital Frontier that specializes in the production of 3DCG animation and anime.

Establishment
The company was established in 2006 as a sub-contracting studio that specialized in 3DCG production, and was involved with various works such as Psycho-Pass and Noblesse. In 2016, Gemba released its first major production, an iteration of Kentaro Miura's Berserk co-animated with 2D studio Millepensee. Despite a decade of experience with 3DCG, the series received harsh criticism towards its CG animation from viewers and critics alike.  Reception to the studio's second major production, The Magnificent Kotobuki, has been more positive, contrastly.

Works

Anime television series

Films

References

External links
GEMBA Official Website 

 
Japanese animation studios
Japanese companies established in 2006
Animation studios in Tokyo
Mass media companies established in 2006